Haby Wande Guereve (born 6 February 2000), also known as Wande Guereve, is a Malian footballer who plays as a midfielder for AS Monaco FF and the Mali women's national team.

Club career
Guereve is a Paris Saint-Germain product. She has played for FC Rouen and Bergerac Périgord FC in France and for Monaco in Monaco.

International career
Guereve capped for Mali at senior level during the 2022 Africa Women Cup of Nations qualification.

References

External links

2000 births
Living people
Citizens of Mali through descent
Malian women's footballers
Women's association football midfielders
AS Monaco FC players
Mali women's international footballers
Malian expatriate footballers
Malian expatriate sportspeople in Monaco
Expatriate footballers in Monaco
Sportspeople from Bondy
French women's footballers
Paris Saint-Germain Féminine players
FC Rouen players
Bergerac Périgord FC players
French expatriate footballers
French expatriate sportspeople in Monaco
Black French sportspeople
French sportspeople of Malian descent
Footballers from Seine-Saint-Denis